Valtierra is a town and municipality located in the province and autonomous community of Navarre, northern Spain. (Bazterra in euskera)

In 918, Ordoño II of Asturias and Sancho I of Pamplona attacked the fortress of Valtierra and burned its mosque and surrounding territory but failed to take the town.

References

External links
 VALTIERRA in the Bernardo Estornés Lasa - Auñamendi Encyclopedia (Euskomedia Fundazioa) 

Municipalities in Navarre